Maka Rud (also Romanized as Makā Rūd) is a village in Kuhestan Rural District, Kelardasht District, Chalus County, Mazandaran Province, Iran. At the 2006 census, its population was 90, in 26 families.

References 

Populated places in Chalus County